Iona Preparatory School, or simply Iona Prep, is an independent, Roman Catholic, all-male, college-preparatory school located in the north end of New Rochelle, New York, in suburban Westchester County. It consists of the Upper School for Grades 9 through 12 and the Lower School (formerly Iona Grammar School) for Grades kindergarten through eighth grade. The primary and secondary schools are located on separate and nearby campuses less than a mile apart on Stratton Road. It is a privately-owned independent school without parochial affiliation and is located within the Roman Catholic Archdiocese of New York.  The school was named for the Scottish island of Iona, the school was founded in 1916 by the Congregation of Christian Brothers. 

Iona Prep is the brother school to The Ursuline School, a local Catholic girls' school, and shares a history with nearby Iona University, which was founded 24 years after the Prep in 1940. The Prep and college shared a common campus at 715 North Avenue until the Upper School completed the move in 1968 to its fifth and final home on a  campus at 255 Wilmot Road.

As of 2021, Iona Prep had an enrollment of 1,079 students – 901 in the Upper School and 182 in the Lower School.  The Upper School maintains a student dress code that includes a dress shirt and tie with a blazer and dress slacks.

History

Founding 
Upon invitation by Judge Martin J. Keogh, Iona Prep was founded in 1916 by the Congregation of Christian Brothers as The Iona School. Br. Joseph Ignatius Doorley – an educator from County Carlow, Ireland – served as the school's first principal. The institution was established as a Catholic school operated by the Irish Christian Brothers (as they were then known) to educate elementary and secondary school students. The founder of the  Order of Christian Brothers, Edmund Ignatius Rice, remained a prominent figure in the school's educational vision. The fledgling Iona School was located at the Stern Estate on Webster Avenue in New Rochelle and rented a facility to accommodate its class of 37 students. It derived its name from the small Scottish island of Iona, known for its Gaelic monasticism that dates back to the arrival in AD 563 of missionary and abbot St. Columba, an important individual in the Christian Brothers' guiding mission.

After three years, the school had outgrown the rather modest capacity of the single building on the estate, and Iona moved to a new  location. The land, which abuts the Beechmont section of New Rochelle and is bounded by North Avenue, was purchased by Br. Doorley from retired Presbyterian minister Rev. Thomas Hall for $85,000 in 1919. This land today is owned and operated by Iona College.

Expansion 
.

In 1924, Doorley Hall was the first academic building constructed on the new campus of The Iona School; the building was named for the school's first principal. Land for a track that was also used for football and baseball was donated to Iona in 1927; this sports venue is today known as Mazzella Field. To accommodate the extracurricular life of its growing student body, Iona erected Harris Gym, its first gymnasium, in 1930 (today known as Amend Hall).

The founding of Iona College in 1940 resulted in the friendly appropriation of a number of Iona School buildings for use by the college and the construction of new buildings for the former, all occurring on the shared campus. A science hall was built in 1940, providing The Iona School with additional facilities for its expanding school but its use in this capacity was short-lived, as the building was soon converted into the first hall of the new Iona College (Cornelia Hall). The Iona School thrived and even grew despite the stresses placed on its finances and administration during World War II.

The Iona School again moved to a new home in 1950, albeit this time the move was across its own campus. Its center became the building that is now Hagan Hall, home to Iona College's business school, and remained so for 17 years.  

Haag Field was constructed behind the new school and served as Iona Prep's football field from 1951 through 1962. The site is now occupied by a parking garage for Iona College.

1950s to present 

The Iona School underwent significant transformation in the mid-1950s. In order to create a more focused education for elementary and secondary students, The Iona School was split into Iona Preparatory School and Iona Grammar School in 1954.

In February 1955, Iona Grammar School, serving pre-kindergarten through eighth grade students, relocated to its present campus on Stratton Road, the former home and estate of Harry M. Stevens, a food concessionaire who is sometimes attributed with the invention of the hot dog.

For the next six decades, Iona Grammar and Iona Prep (as a high school) would evolve as distinct academic and financial entities, though each remained as a Christian Brothers school.

With Iona College requiring increasing space and Iona Prep undergoing continual growth, the Prep saw the need for a campus of its own. After acquiring the   Matthew Carney Estate on Stratton Road, which was a third of a mile from the Iona Grammar School campus and three miles north of Iona College, Iona Prep broke ground on January 2, 1965, on the present-day campus. By 1968, the move to its current location was complete.

In 2013, Iona Prep and Iona Grammar reunited for the first time in almost 60 years as a single K–12 school known as Iona Preparatory School.

Iona Grammar School had declared its inability to operate with financial solvency after several years of difficulties due to the combination of declining enrollment and financial burdens that had been placed on the worldwide Christian Brothers Institute.  The financial problems followed legal settlements with claimants who alleged illicit sexual misconduct (primarily outside the United States). 

Due to the shared history, name, and cordial relations between the two schools, Iona Grammar was subsumed into Iona Preparatory. The combined Iona Preparatory School now operates under a unified administration across its two campuses called the Iona Prep Lower School and the Iona Prep Upper School.

Academics

To gain admission to Iona, students must sit for the ISEE, SSAT, or TACHS entrance exam.

The majority of students commute from Westchester County, Putnam County, Manhattan, the Bronx, and Fairfield County. International students, primarily from Ireland and China, attend Iona Prep as well under a cultural exchange program.

The Iona Prep Upper School's curriculum is a broad encompassment of the humanities, sciences, mathematics, classics, social sciences, and the arts. Each student takes four years of mathematics, science, religion, history, and one year of art and music. All students study Latin and/or Ancient Greek as well as a modern language of either Spanish, Italian, or Mandarin Chinese.

Beginning in junior year, students have a number of electives from which they may choose. Additionally, each Upper School student must engage in community service throughout all four years as a requisite for graduation.

Iona Prep was named a National Blue Ribbon School by the U.S. Department of Education in 2001 and 2002, which is considered "the highest honor an American school can achieve".

The school annually produces a number of National Merit Scholars and AP Scholars.

Technology is integrated inside and outside the classroom. Since 2007, Iona Prep has used Edline for informing parents of student performance through bimonthly updates. Students can also monitor academic progress and receive and submit assignments electronically. All classrooms are equipped with Smart Board interactive whiteboard technology.

The biology, chemistry, and physics laboratories were renovated in 2011 and 2013 with state-of-the-art instruments and technology specific to each science.

Iona Prep has three tiers of academic offerings: core, honors, and Advanced Placement and superior talent enrichment program (STEP). The following 14 Advanced Placement courses are offered annually: Biology, Chemistry, Physics, Calculus AB, Psychology, Statistics, English Language and Composition, English Literature and Composition, European History, United States History, World History, US Government and Politics, Italian Language, and Spanish Language.

In addition to the core and honors curricula, Iona offers STEP. STEP is a rigorous two-year program for the most highly qualified freshmen and sophomore students that involves a more intensive study of Latin and mandatory AP and STEP-specific classes in English and history. Advanced-level classes in science, mathematics, and foreign language are also expected.

Typically, 100% of Iona Prep's graduates go on to attend a four-year higher education institution, ranging from liberal-arts colleges to research universities and from public universities to Ivy League schools.

Campus 

The main academic building houses the administration (including the offices of the president, Upper School principal, and deans), the majority of classrooms and laboratories, the school bookstore, and a performing arts stage.

The Jakeway Library contains print and digital books along with study space and computers for students. The D'Urso Conference Center provides additional study space for students and facilities for faculty and administrators. A chapel is located on campus for use by students and faculty and for school religious functions.

The Paul Verni Fine Arts Center is located on the Upper School campus. This building is home to the school's visual art and music programs as well as a digital media studio used for creating and broadcasting the daily programs of Gael Force Live.

The Upper School also provides for students numerous facilities for varsity, junior varsity, and intramural athletics, recreation, and physical education. Additionally, the campus contains the Tully Gymnasium and Heffernan Gymnasium.

The Lower School is located approximately one third of a mile away from the Upper School at its own  campus that occupies both sides of Stratton Road in New Rochelle.

It houses the academic and administrative building (including the office of the Lower School principal) with its library in addition to a residence of Christian Brothers. It maintains several athletic facilities, including a football field, a regulation-size and a junior baseball field, a general-purpose soccer field, an indoor gymnasium, and outdoor basketball courts. It also has a play area with swing sets and recreational facilities for younger students.

Service
The community service program at Iona Prep stems from philosophical principles guided by Catholic doctrine regarding social issues. All Iona Preparatory students perform volunteer service. Iona Prep stipulates that freshmen, sophomores, juniors, and seniors complete a minimum amount of service for their community, with expectations increasing incrementally according to student year.

In addition to a number of service programs in local communities, Iona Prep has several areas of interest throughout the United States and in foreign countries. One of the largest programs is the annual service trip to Lima, Peru in which students and faculty work to better the lives of disadvantaged denizens. Iona Prep also has missions in New Orleans, Washington, DC, Florida, New York City, the Dominican Republic, and at the US-Mexico border in Texas.

Extracurricular activities
There are numerous extracurricular and co-curricular activities in which students may partake. Among these are clubs for movies, video games, and photography. There are several heritage societies along with acting and film clubs. There are also genre-specific music ensembles in which students can perform.

Speech and debate 
Iona Prep is known for its speech and debate (forensics) team. In 1999, Iona Prep was the National Forensics League Champion, and had multiple national champions in multiple events. The team has experienced continual success, being periodically ranked as first in New York State and among top schools in the United States in the National Speech and Debate Association and National Catholic Forensic League. It has produced many national finalists, particularly from 2011 to 2015. Iona is especially strong in extemporaneous speaking, congressional debate, and original oratory.

Clubs and groups

Athletics

Iona Prep has an array of varsity and junior varsity athletic teams along with intramural teams. A member of the Catholic High School Athletic Association, the Iona Prep Gaels compete against schools from surrounding Westchester, New York City, Long Island, and Connecticut as well as against schools across New York State and the country in iterations of elimination rounds and championships.

The many sports facilities are shared by various teams. The main artificial turf field is used for competition by several of the school's teams including football and lacrosse. It is enclosed by a 400-meter track equipped with steeplechase and long jump areas as well as an electronic scoreboard and two-story press box. The rear of the school contains an updated baseball field, tennis courts, and areas for field sports. A fitness and weights room was recently renovated for use by athletes.

The sports offered by Iona Prep include:

Football
Football has long been a tradition within Iona Prep's athletics. Competition with rivals including Archbishop Stepinac High School and Saint Anthony's has driven the school's football ambitions. Dating back to coach Renzie Lamb's undefeated 1967 football team, football has been a major focus of the school's athletic spirit.

Iona Prep played New Rochelle High School annually on Thanksgiving Day in a rivalry game called the "Turkey Bowl". This tradition ended with the 2002 game (when Ray Rice was a sophomore at NRHS), due to the advent of a postseason tournament in the Catholic High School Football League and the New York State Public High School Championships.

On November 2, 2008, Iona Prep won its ninth consecutive game of the year when the Gaels upended Saint Francis Prep 47–7 at Iona field. Iona Prep was then cast as the number one seed in the upcoming Catholic High School Football League playoffs.

On November 22, 2008, Iona Prep took its fourth CHSFL title and first AAA championship in school history when the Gaels outlasted Saint Anthony's 48–35 in wintery conditions during a night game at Mitchel Field in Uniondale, Nassau County. The win capped the team's first twelve-win season in school history - first undefeated season (12-0) in 41 years - and broke Saint Anthony's streak of seven consecutive CHSFL titles.

Undefeated and one-loss seasons
 1931:  8-0
 1932:  9-1
 1943:  5-0-2
 1944:  6-0-2
 1945:  7-1
 1946:  8-0
 1947:  8-0
 1948:  6-1-1
 1953:  6-1-1
 1954:  7-1
 1967:  8-0
 1971:  7-1
 2008:  12-0

CHSFL Championships
 1954:  7-1
 1967:  8-0
 1971:  7-1 (Metropolitan Champion)
 2000: AA Champion
 2008: 12-0 (AAA Champion)
 2016: AA Champion

Other sports
The school has won numerous golfing championships. The Gaels have been successful in the CHSAA hockey league, only losing two league games, and consistently being ranked on the Journal News' Top 5 teams.  They team had a very successful campaign in the 2007–08 season, winning the regular season championship, as well as the CHSHL championship 3–2 in OT in a best-of-three series over arch-rival Archbishop Stepinac High School.

The rowing and wrestling teams have experienced victories over rival Fordham Prep. In 2009, the rowing team fielded three Division I college recruits, and placed 2nd in the state in the Sr. 4+ to go along with a state championship in the Jr. 4+.

The 2009 varsity basketball team finished with a 26–2 record. Head coach Victor Quirolo, who was also Iona's varsity football coach, a team that went a perfect 12-0 and won the CHSFL AAA Championship, led his squad to victory in the City Catholic High School and the State Catholic High School Championships.

Notable alumni
 Frank Abagnale (1966) - perpetrator of bank fraud in the late 1960s, portrayed by Leonardo DiCaprio in the movie Catch Me If You Can.
 Dick Ambrose (1971) - NFL Player, Cleveland Browns
 Mark Berardo (1986) - singer-songwriter
 James William Colbert Jr. (1938) - physician and academic vice president of the Medical University of South Carolina
 Bud Cort (1966) - actor, best known for Harold and Maude
 Tommy Dreamer (1988) - WWE & ECW pro wrestler
 John P. Donohue, M.D. (1950) - pioneered the development of chemotherapy and nerve sparing surgical techniques for testicular cancer
 Gerard Finneran (1955) – Member of the first United States Air Force Academy graduating class; later worked as investment banker on Wall Street but best known for involvement in 1995 air rage incident.
 Pete Gaudet (1960) - former head basketball coach at Army, former assistant basketball coach at Duke University under Mike Krzyzewski
Nick Gregory (1978) - television weatherman on Fox 5 News in New York
 Butch Harmon - well-known golf instructor who coached Tiger Woods, attended Iona Prep for one year (1958-'59), before he transferred to New Rochelle High School the following year
Ty Jerome (2016) - NBA point-guard for the Oklahoma City Thunder, won a national championship in 2019 with the University of Virginia
Chris Kerson - film, television, and theater actor, best known for his role in True Detective
 Don McLean (1963) - musician, best known for the 1971 song, "American Pie"
 John Mara (1972) - co-owner of NFL's New York Giants
 Bob Mayo (1969) - keyboardist on Frampton Comes Alive
 L. J. Mazzilli (transferred) - professional baseball player
 Brian Moran (2006) - professional baseball player
 Colin Moran (2010) - professional baseball player
 Tommy Mottola (1966) - Sony executive, ex-husband of Mariah Carey
  The Reverend Leo J. O'Donovan, S.J. (1952) - former President of Georgetown University
 Patrick Pizzella (1972) - Deputy Secretary of Labor (2017–2021) and acting Secretary of Labor (2020), appointee in Reagan, George H. W. Bush, George W. Bush, Obama & Trump administrations
 Alex Raymond (1927) - creator of Flash Gordon comic strip
 Bill Reilly (c. 1956) - founder and chairman of Primedia.
 Matt Ryan (2015) - American professional basketball player for the Minnesota Timberwolves
 Brian Slocum (1999) - major league baseball player, pitches for the Pittsburgh Pirates
 Donald Spoto (1959) - celebrity biographer and historian

See also 

 Catholic Schools in the United States
 List of Christian Brothers schools
 Congregation of Christian Brothers
 Iona College (New York)
 Education in Westchester County

References

External links

Education in New Rochelle, New York
Congregation of Christian Brothers secondary schools
Catholic secondary schools in New York (state)
Catholic elementary schools in New York (state)
Boys' schools in New York (state)
Educational institutions established in 1916
Private K-12 schools in Westchester County, New York
Preparatory schools in New York (state)
1916 establishments in New York (state)